Rowayton station is a commuter rail station on the Metro-North Railroad New Haven Line, located in the Rowayton neighborhood of Norwalk, Connecticut.

Nineteenth-century artist and humanitarian Vincent Colyer helped to get the original station built.

Station layout 
The station has two high-level side platforms, each six cars long, serving the outer tracks of the four-track Northeast Corridor.

References

External links

Bureau of Public Transportation of the Connecticut Department of Transportation, "Rowayton Train Station Visual Inspection Report" dated January 2007
 Rowayton Avenue entrance from Google Maps Street View
 http://www.ct.gov/dot/lib/dot/documents/dpt/1_Station_Inspection_Summary_Report.pdf

Metro-North Railroad stations in Connecticut
Stations on the Northeast Corridor
Stations along New York, New Haven and Hartford Railroad lines
Buildings and structures in Norwalk, Connecticut
Railroad stations in Fairfield County, Connecticut